Franek is the oldest oil shaft in the world, located in the village of Bóbrka, Poland. It was dug in 1854 by hand by Ignacy Łukasiewicz.

References

Oil wells